The Church of the Most Precious Blood is a Roman Catholic parish located in New York City. The parish is under the authority of the Archdiocese of New York, and is the National Shrine Church of San Gennaro. Located at 113 Baxter Street with an additional entrance on Mulberry Street, the Church of the Most Precious Blood is part of Manhattan's Little Italy neighborhood. The Most Precious Blood parished merged with Old St. Patrick's Cathedral parish, and the two churches share priests and administrative staff.

History
The parish of the Most Precious Blood was established in 1888 as a National Parish to serve the rapidly growing number of Italian immigrants in Lower Manhattan. Building of the church was begun by the Scalabrini Fathers around 1891. The Scalabrini Order built the foundation but ran out of funding.  The Franciscans then took over the parish and completed the church building in 1904.

Located just north of Five Points, it was in a rough neighborhood. In July 1898 Father Buonaventura Piscopo's efforts to combat immoral behavior in the area prompted death threats.

San Gennaro Festival 
During the Feast of San Gennaro, which is held yearly in September, a celebratory Mass is held at the church on the September 19th the feast day of San Gennaro. After the Mass, a statue of San Gennaro is taken from its home within the church on a procession through the streets of Little Italy. 

Most Precious Blood is home to several vibrant religious societies in addition to the Figli di San Gennaro, including: the Community of Sant Egidio, and the San Angelo Society. Besides the strong Italian tradition, the Vietnamese congregation has also grown in recent years. The Church is home to the Vietnamese Arts and Learning Cultural Center.

The Saint Rocco of Potenza Society was originally founded in 1889 at the now demolished St. Joachim's Church on Roosevelt Street. It then moved to St. Joseph Church on Monroe Street, but with the merger in 2015 of St. Joseph's with the Church of the Transfiguration on Mott Street, the Society is now based at the Shrine Church of the Most Precious Blood. 

Due to manpower shortages, in March 2014, the Franciscans withdrew from Most Precious Blood and it came under diocesan administration. In 2015, the church became part of the parish of St. Patrick's Old Cathedral. Mass is celebrated at Most Precious Blood on Wednesdays and Sundays. In 2018, the parish rectory on Mulberry Street was listed for sale.

During the Extraordinary Jubilee of Mercy, from 8 December 2015, the Feast of the Immaculate Conception, to 20 November 2016, the Feast of Christ the King, was one of the sites of the Holy doors.

Architecture
The church was designed by William Schickel & Company, who provided an Italian Franciscan style structure. The marble main and side altars are by Borgia Marble Works of New York. The interior is decorated in Neapolitan Baroque style. Donatus Buongiorno created thirty oil painting murals for the walls and ceiling. The building was renovated in 1995 by the Gargiulo Brothers Construction Company of Mount Vernon, to repair damage suffered from water leakage and general disrepair. The Church was re-consecrated by Archbishop John Cardinal O'Connor on February 7, 1997.

References

External links

Roman Catholic Archdiocese of New York
Roman Catholic churches in Manhattan
Italian-American culture in New York City
Lower Manhattan
Scalabrinians
Italian-American Roman Catholic national parishes in the United States
Roman Catholic churches completed in 1904
20th-century Roman Catholic church buildings in the United States
Holy Blood churches